Fried fish is any fish or shellfish that has been prepared by frying. Often, the fish is covered in batter, egg and breadcrumbs, flour, or herbs and spices before being fried and served, often with a slice of lemon.

Fish is fried in many parts of the world, and fried fish is an important food in many cuisines.  For many cultures, fried fish is historically derived from pescado frito, and the traditional fish and chips dish of England which it may have inspired.  The latter remains a staple take-out dish of the UK and its former and present colonies.  Fried fishcakes made of cod (and other white fish, such as haddock, halibut or whiting) are a widely available in the frozen food sections of U.S. grocery stores. Long John Silver's, Skipper's, Captain D's, and Arthur Treacher's are well-known North American chain restaurants that serve fried fish as their main food offering. Catfish are also a prevalent farm-raised type of fish that is often served fried throughout the world. A classic fried fish recipe from France is the Sole meunière.

Fish fries
Community fish fries are popular in the southern region of the United States. These social gatherings may center around a church, a civic organization or serve as a fundraiser for a club, volunteer fire department, a school or other organization. In the U.S., especially the Upper Midwest, the Northeast, and the Mid-Atlantic states, community fish fries are somewhat popular, sometimes held in church basements or lots in observation of Lent. A fish fry is generally informal.  A "shore lunch" is a tradition in the northern U.S. and Canada, where outdoor enthusiasts cook their catch on the shores of the ocean, or lake where the fish was caught.

Health effects

Fried fish is associated with an increased risk of cardiovascular disease. The American Food and Drug Administration and British National Health Service have suggested that broiled or steamed fish is a healthier option than frying.

Frying fish results in higher losses of docosahexaenoic acid (DHA) and eicosapentaenoic acid (EPA) compared to other cooking methods.

Fried fish dishes

See also

 List of fish dishes

Notes

References

 Murdoch (2004) Essential Seafood Cookbook Pan-fries, deep-fries and stir-fries, pp. 56–97. Murdoch Books. .

Fish dishes
Fried foods